"Real Hip-Hop" is a song by American hip hop group Das EFX. It is the lead single from their third studio album Hold It Down (1995). The song was produced by DJ Premier.

Three remixes to the song have been released. Among the artists are producers Pete Rock and Solid Scheme and rapper PMD.

Track listings
Information taken from Discogs.

 A-Side

 "Real Hip-Hop" (Premier's LP Version) - 4:09
 "Real Hip-Hop" (Pete Rock Remix) - 4:18
 "Real Hip-Hop" (Solid Scheme Remix) - 4:12
 "Real Hip-Hop" (PMD Remix) - 4:32

 B-Side

 "No Diggedy" (LP Version) - 4:02
 "Real Hip-Hop" (LP Instrumental) - 4:09
 "Real Hip-Hop" (Pete Rock Remix Instrumental) - 4:18
 "Real Hip-Hop" (Acapella) - 3:50

Charts

References

1995 singles
1995 songs
Das EFX songs
East West Records singles
Songs written by DJ Premier
Song recordings produced by DJ Premier